High Priestess  is an Indian Telugu-language thriller web series by Pushpa Ignatius that premiered on ZEE5 on 25 April 2019. It is directed by Ignatius and stars Amala Akkineni and Kishore Kumar.

Promotion 
The series was announced with six other Telugu ZEE5 Originals in November 2018 which also marks debut of Amala Akkineni into web series. On 5 April 2019, the first look of Amala was released on Social media. Following the first look, trailer was released the following week and garnered good response.

Plot 
The series around Swathi Reddy, a renowned Tarot reader who experiences the pasts of her clients. There are total of seven stories which are spread across eight episodes. During these stories the past of Swathi is revealed.

Cast

Main 

Amala Akkineni as Swathi Reddy, a Tarot reader
Kishore Kumar as Vikram, Swathi's friend

Recurring 
 Aadhav Kannadasan as young Vikram
 Bhavani Sre as young Swathi Reddy 
 Monisha Duraibabu as Sneha Reddy, Swathi's daughter

Guests 
 Vijayalakshmi as Pooja
 Nandini Rai as Ruby
 Brahmaji as Lawyer
 Sunaina as Radhika
 Varalaxmi Sarathkumar as Vaishnavi
 Siddhartha Shankar as Ruby's husband

Episodes

References

External links
 
 

Indian television series
ZEE5 original programming
Indian television shows
Indian web series
2019 Indian television series debuts
Telugu-language web series
2019 web series endings
2019 Indian television series endings
2019 web series debuts
Indian thriller television series